Narinder Biba was a very well known Punjabi singer from Punjab, India. She is known for singing Punjabi folklores, love romances of Punjab like Mirza Sahiban, Sassi Punnun and Sikh historical moments like Saka Sirhind and many more.

Family and career 
Biba was married to Jaspal Singh Sodhi. She is regarded as a respectful folk artist from 1960s to 1990s up to the end of her career. She started her career with singer Jagat Singh Jagga. She recorded duets songs as well with Punjabi singers Harcharan Grewal, Muhammad Sadiq, Didar Sandhu, Karnail Gill, Ranbir Singh Rana, Gurcharan Pohli, Faqir Singh Faqirs. She recorded songs penned by lyricist such as Dev Tharikewala, Babu Singh Maan and Inderjeet Hasanpuri among others.

Famous songs 
 Sheher Lahore Ander
 Wadhaiyan Bibi Tainu
 Ladoo Khaa Ke Turdi Bani
 Kall Na Javin Khet Nu
 Mukh Morh Gye Dilan De Jaani
 Aah Lai Maaye Sambh Kunjian
 Paase Hatt Ja Jalma Punjaban Jatti Aayi
 Chann Mata Gujri da
 Do Bariyan Keemti Jindan
 Mata Gujri Nu Devo Ni Wadayian

Today 
In every September in Sadiqpur village, a fair, Narinder Biba Yaadgari Sabhiacharak Mela, is organised by the Doaba Sabhiacharak club in her memory.

See also 
 Surinder Kaur
 Didar Sandhu
 Dev Tharikewala

References 

Punjabi-language singers
Indian Sikhs
1941 births
1997 deaths
20th-century Indian singers